This is a list of annual sports events in the London Borough of Richmond upon Thames.

Current events

Rowing
The Boat Race between the Oxford University Boat Club and the Cambridge University Boat Club, held in March or April
 The Great River Race on the River Thames, between Greenwich and Ham, for traditional-style coxed boats propelled by oars or paddles; it is held in September
 The Head of the River Fours, a processional rowing race held on the Championship Course from Mortlake to Putney in November
 The Head of the River Race,  a similar race open to men's eights, held in March
 The Schools' Head of the River Race, held in the spring
 The Scullers Head of the River Race, held in November or December
 The Vesta Veterans International Eights Head of the River Race, which takes place on the day following the Head of the River Race and is open to veteran (also known as masters) eights
 The Wingfield Sculls, a race between single scullers, held in October or November
 The Women's Eights Head of the River Race, held in March

Rugby
The Big Game, a rugby union match held in December

Former events

Ice skating
Richmond Trophy, an international women's figure skating competition held annually from 1949 to 1980 at the Richmond Ice Rink in Twickenham
St. Ivel International, an international figure skating competition held annually from 1978 to 1980 at the Richmond Ice Rink in Twickenham
 	

Sport in the London Borough of Richmond upon Thames
Richmond upon Thames